The National Football Development Programme of Malaysia (NFDP Malaysia) (PPBN); abbrev: NFDP) is a long-term plan to promote and develop the sport nationally. It is intended to have two phases: 2014-2020 and 2021-2030.

References 

Youth sport in Asia
Sports organizations established in 2014
Sports governing bodies in Malaysia
National football academies
Football academies in Malaysia
Malaysian reserve football teams
Sport in Pahang
Kuantan